The Kataeb Regulatory Forces – KRF or Forces Regulatoires des Kataeb (FRK) in French, were the military wing of the right-wing Lebanese Christian Kataeb Party, otherwise known as the 'Phalange', from 1961 to 1977.  The Kataeb militia, which fought in the early years of the Lebanese Civil War, was the predecessor of the Lebanese Forces.

Origins

The Phalange party militia was not only the largest and best organized political paramilitary force in Lebanon but also the oldest. It was founded in 1937 as the "Militants' organization" (| Tanẓīm al-muqātilīn) by the President of the Party, the za'im (political boss) Pierre Gemayel and William Hawi, a Lebanese-American glass industrialist, who led them during the 1958 civil war.  Fighting alongside the pro-government forces in support of President Camille Chamoun, the Phalangists defended the Matn District, a traditional Phalangist stronghold centered at the town of Bikfaya – the Gemayel family's feudal seat –, and kept the main roads connecting Beirut to that territory open, where the Gemayels held numerous commercial interests.

Disbanded in January 1961 by order of the Kataeb Party' Political Bureau, Hawi created in their place the Kataeb Regulatory Forces. In order to coordinate the activities of all Phalange paramilitary forces, the Political Bureau set up the Kataeb War Council (Arabic: Majliss al-Harbi) in 1970, with William Hawi being appointed as head.  The seat of the Council was allocated at the Kataeb Party's Headquarters at the heart of Achrafieh quarter in East Beirut and a quiet expansion of KRF units followed suit, complemented by the development of a training infrastructure. Two company-sized Special Forces units, the "1st Commando" and the "2nd Commando" were created in 1963, soon followed by the "Pierre Gemayel" (PG) squad (later a company) and a VIP protection squad.  To this was added in 1973 another commando platoon (Arabic: Maghaweer) and a "Combat School" was secretly opened at Tabrieh in the Keserwan District; another special unit, the "Bashir Gemayel brigade" – named after Pierre Gemayel's youngest son, Bashir – was formed in the following year, absorbing the old PG company in the process.

Military structure and organization

By April 1975 the Kataeb Regulatory Forces (KRF) were able to muster 5,000 militiamen, a total which included 2,000 full-time uniformed fighters backed by some 3,000 irregulars, originally armed with obsolete firearms. However, some sources place the total of RF fighters higher, around 8,000, organized into autonomous companies or battalions drawn from local Phalange party' sections (Arabic: qism). Each section was responsible for handling all defensive or offensive military operations on their home districts, except for the regular units (the "Commando", Maghaweer and PG companies), which were often deployed as mobile quick reaction forces.  Although its membership and command structure was predominately Maronite, the KRF also included a few Greek-Catholics and Armenians in its ranks.

The KRF was re-organized and expanded in May 1975, and new specialized units were raised – a Signals battalion (Arabic: Silah al-Ichara), an armoured battalion (a.k.a. 2nd Armoured Battalion; Arabic: Silah al-Moudara'a) led by Joseph Elias, a battalion-sized women's section (Arabic: Nizamiyyat) led by Jocelyne Khoueiry, and an artillery group (Arabic: Silah al-Madfa'aiya) led by Antoine Bridi.  To maintain law and order in the areas under Phalangist control at Beirut and elsewhere, in 1976 a 1,000-strong Police unit, the Kataeb Security Detachments or "Sections Kataeb de Securité" (SKS) in French was formed and commanded by Raymond Assayan.  The Phalangists practiced conscription in the areas they controlled, drafting eligible young men to swell its ranks, and by January 1976 the KRF had increased to 10,000–15,000 men and women, this number including civilian recruits and deserters from the Lebanese Army. According to other sources, the KRF regular forces comprised more than 3,000 full-time uniformed fighters by mid-1978.

KRF militia units operated mainly in East Beirut, the Aley District, the Matn District, Mount Lebanon, the Koura and Keserwan Districts, but also had a presence at the south in the Jabal Amel, where their local militants – after merging with local Shia Muslim and Druze militias – played a key part in the formation on 21 October 1976 of the Israeli-backed informal "Army for the Defense of South Lebanon" or ADSL (French: Armée de Défense du Liban-Sud or ADLS), later to become known as the "Free Lebanese Army" (FLA), the predecessor of the South Lebanon Army (SLA).

After Hawi was killed in action at Tel al-Zaatar by a Palestinian sniper on 13 July 1976, he was replaced by Bashir Gemayel, the senior KRF Inspector since 1971 and future supremo of the Lebanese Forces. On August that year, he moved the Kataeb War Council from the Kataeb Party's offices in Achrafieh to his new Headquarters situated in an abandoned hospital at the Karantina neighborhood located east of the Port of Beirut.

List of KRF Commanders
 William Hawi (1961–1976)
 Bashir Gemayel (1976–1980)

KRF junior commanders
 Amine Gemayel
 Antoine Bridi
 Boutros Khawand
 Elie Hobeika (a.k.a. 'HK')
 Elie Zayek
 Fadi Frem
 Fouad Abou Nader
 Jocelyne Khoueiry
 Joseph Elias
 Joseph Saadeh
 Massoud Achkar (a.k.a. 'Poussy' Achkar)
 Raymond Assayan
 Sami Khoueiry
 Samir Geagea (a.k.a. 'Hakim')

Other KRF personnel
 Richard Millet

Weapons and equipment
Prior to the war, the Kataeb militia initially received covert support from the Lebanese Army, Egypt and Jordan, and from well-connected right-wing sympathisers in Spain, France, Belgium, Britain, and West Germany. Weapons were procured in the international black market or directly from eastern bloc countries, namely Czechoslovakia, Bulgaria and Romania; from January 1976 onwards they were secretly financed and armed by Israel, though they also received some aid from Syria. The collapse of the Lebanese Armed Forces (LAF) and the Internal Security Forces (ISF) in January 1976, coupled by the massive influx of Israeli military aid, enabled the KRF to be re-equipped with a variety of modern small-arms and heavy weapons seized from LAF barracks and ISF Police stations or supplied by the Israelis. Besides providing training, weapons and ammunition, the Lebanese Army also lent to the KRF sophisticated mobile communications equipment.

Small-arms
Phalangist militiamen were provided with a variety of small arms, comprising Lee-Enfield, Pattern 1914 Enfield, MAS-36 and Karabiner 98k bolt-action rifles, M1 Garand (or its Italian-produced copy, the Beretta Model 1952), Vz. 52 and SKS semi-automatic rifles, PPD-40, PPSh-41, M1A1 Thompson, Sten Mk V, MAT-49, Škorpion vz. 61, Carl Gustaf m/45 (or its Egyptian-produced version, dubbed the "Port Said"), Walther MPL and Sterling L2A3/Mark 4 submachine guns. Assault rifles and carbines consisted of Sturmgewehr 44, M16A1, FN FAL (variants included the Israeli-produced 'lightened' ROMAT), FN CAL, Heckler & Koch G3, SIG SG 543 carbines, SIG SG 542, Vz. 58, AK-47 and AKM assault rifles (other variants included the Zastava M70, Chinese Type 56, Romanian Pistol Mitralieră model 1963/1965, Bulgarian AKK/AKKS and former East German MPi-KMS-72 assault rifles).

Several models of handguns were used, including Smith & Wesson Model 10, Smith & Wesson Model 13, Smith & Wesson Model 14, Smith & Wesson Model 15, Smith & Wesson Model 17 and Smith & Wesson Model 19 revolvers, Mauser C96 "broomhandle" pistols, Mauser HSc, Luger P08, Walther P38, Walther PPK, Heckler & Koch P7, Heckler & Koch P9, Tokarev TT-33, CZ 52, CZ 75, CZ 82/83, CZ 85, FN Browning M1910, FN Browning M1922, FN Browning BDA380, FN P35, Beretta M1951, Colt M1911A1, MAB PA-15, Star 30M, and Star A, B, B Super and P pistols.

Squad weapons consisted of Chatellerault FM Mle 1924/29, Bren Mk. I .303 (7.7mm), M1918A2 BAR, MG 34, MG 42, Rheinmetall MG 3, Heckler & Koch HK21, AA-52, RPD, RPK, FN MAG and M60 light machine guns, with heavier Browning M1919A4 .30 Cal, Browning M2HB .50 Cal, SG-43/SGM Goryunov and DShKM machine guns being employed as platoon and company weapons. Grenade launchers and portable anti-tank weapons included M203 grenade launchers, M9A1 80mm Bazookas, LRAC Mle 50, M72 LAW, RPG-2 and RPG-7 rocket launchers, whilst crew-served and indirect fire weapons comprised M29 81mm light mortars, plus B-10 82mm, B-11 107mm and M40A1 106mm recoilless rifles (often mounted on technicals). Soviet PTRS-41 14.5mm anti-tank rifles were used for heavy sniping.

Armoured and transport vehicles

A predominately light infantry force, the KRF raised early in 1975 a mechanized corps made of gun trucks and technicals. The corps' inventory consisted mainly of commandeered M151A1 utility trucks, VIASA MB-CJ6 and Willys M38A1 MD jeeps, Land-Rover series II-III, Santana Series III (Spanish-produced version of the Land-Rover series III), Morattab Series IV (Iranian-produced unlicensed version of the Land-Rover long wheelbase series III) Toyota Land Cruiser (J40/J42) and Dodge Power Wagon W200 pickups, Dodge D series (3rd generation), GMC Sierra Custom K25/K30, Chevrolet C-10/C-15 Cheyenne and Chevrolet C-20 Scottsdale light pickup trucks, and Mercedes-Benz Unimog 406 light trucks, GMC C4500 medium-duty trucks, GMC C7500 heavy-duty cargo trucks, and US M35A1 2½-ton cargo trucks, equipped with heavy machine guns (HMGs), recoilless rifles and anti-aircraft autocannons. For logistical support, the KRF relied on Toyota Land Cruiser (J42) hardtop pickups, Range Rover first generation Sport utility vehicles (SUV), Chevrolet C-20 Scottsdale light pickup trucks, GAZ-66, Chevrolet C-50 medium-duty, Dodge F600 medium-duty and GMC C4500 medium-duty trucks, and GMC C7500 heavy-duty cargo trucks; a number of Chevrolet/GMC G-Series third generation vans were used as military ambulances.

The Phalangists' own modest armored force of five homebuilt armored cars employed in October 1975 at the Battle of the Hotels in Beirut was also augmented in January 1976 with some ex-LAF vehicles such as AMX-13 and M41A3 Walker Bulldog light tanks, Charioteer tanks, M42 Duster SPAAGs, M113 and Panhard M3 VTT armored personnel carriers, Panhard AML-90 armored cars, Staghound armoured cars, and Cadillac Gage V-100 Commando cars.
This enabled the quick expansion of the KRF armoured corps to brigade strength, further augmented by a consignment of twenty ex-Israeli M50 Super Sherman medium tanks (one M50 tank was later lent to the allied Guardians of the Cedars militia, leaving the KRF with a total of 19 Shermans) and M3/M9 Zahlam half-tracks, plus a number of BTR-152 APCs captured from the Syrians or supplied by Israel.

Artillery
Their artillery corps was equally expanded after obtaining a number of British QF Mk III 25 Pounder field guns, French Mle 1950 BF-50 155mm howitzers, Soviet M1938 (M-30) 122 mm howitzers, British Bofors 40mm L/60 anti-aircraft guns and Soviet AZP S-60 57mm anti-aircraft guns. Soviet ZPU (ZPU-1, ZPU-2, ZPU-4) 14.5mm, Yugoslav Zastava M55 20mm and ZU-23-2 23mm AA autocannons (mostly mounted on technicals and heavier transport trucks) were employed in the direct fire support role. These artillery pieces were either seized from LAF stocks, acquired on the black market or even provided by Israel and Syria.

Administrative organization and illegal activities

The Phalange was the first Lebanese faction to carve out its own Canton in late 1976, designated variously as the East Beirut canton, "Christian Country", "Maronite enclave" or "Marounistan".  Covering a surface of 2,000 square kilometers, the Canton comprised the Matn District, most of the Keserwan District, along with East Beirut, and the coastal districts of Jounieh, Amsheet, Byblos and parts of Batroun.

Considered by many analysts as the best organized of all militia "fiefs" in the whole of Lebanon, it was administrated by a network of Phalangist-controlled business corporations headed by "Chef" Boutros Khawand, which included the GAMMA Group brain-trust, the DELTA computer company, and the SONAPORT holding. The latter run since 1975 the legal commercial ports of Jounieh and Beirut, including the infamous clandestine "Dock Five" (French: Cinquième basin), near the Karantina KRF's HQ, from which the Phalange extracted additional revenues by levying illegal taxes and carried out drug-trafficking and arms-smuggling operations.

The Canton was also served by a clandestine-built airstrip, the Pierre Gemayel International Airport, opened in 1976 at Hamat, north of Batroun, and had its own radio station, "The Voice of Lebanon" (Arabic: Iza'at Sawt Loubnan) or "La Voix du Liban" (VDL) in French, set up in that same year.

Controversy

Stubborn and ruthless fighters with a reputation for racketeering, the Phalangists themselves were not above of committing sectarian violence, a trait they manifested early on in the years leading to the civil war. On 24 March 1970 a squad of Phalange militiamen led by Bashir Gemayel ambushed a PLO funeral cortege heading for Damascus when it passed through the Christian village of Kahale in the Aley District, killing ten people and wounding an even greater number, mostly Palestinians.

Apart from being implicated in the early April 1975 Bus massacre that helped trigger the civil war, the Kataeb RF perpetrated the infamous Black Saturday killings – allegedly carried out by Phalange military commander Joseph Saadeh in retaliation for the assassination of his son – that killed about 200–300 Lebanese Muslim and Druze residents of East Beirut and drove 50,000 others out between December 1975 and January 1976.

During July–August of that same year, the Phalangists participated alongside its allies, the Army of Free Lebanon (AFL), Al-Tanzim, NLP Tigers Militia, Guardians of the Cedars (GoC), the Tyous Team of Commandos (TTC) and the Lebanese Youth Movement (LYM) in the sieges – and subsequent massacres – of Karantina, Al-Masklah and Tel al-Zaatar at the Muslim-populated slum districts and adjacent Palestinian refugee camps of East Beirut, and at the town of Dbayeh in the Matn District.

The Kataeb RF was equally involved in atrocities committed against rival Christian militias' and their leaders, namely the Ehden massacre in June 1978 which cost the life of Tony Franjieh, head of the Marada Brigade, and the Safra massacre of July 1980, on which the Phalangists destroyed the NLP Tigers Militia (though they prudently allowed the Tigers' own Commander Dany Chamoun to escape to exile). In May 1979, the Phalangists even battled both the NLP Tigers and the Guardians of the Cedars for control of the Furn esh Shebbak and Ain el-Rammaneh districts in East Beirut, and for the town of Akoura in the Byblos District.

Sporadic clashes with the Lebanese government military and security forces also occurred. During the blockade of Tel al-Zaatar on 11 January 1976, KRF militiamen fired on a Lebanese Army relief convoy that was trying to enter the camp, killing two regular soldiers. On 1 November 1978, at the Saint Nicholas Church crossing in Achrafieh, KRF militiamen ambushed the motorcade of the then Lebanese Defense and Foreign Affairs Minister Fouad Boutros, escorted by a commando detachment from the Counter-sabotage regiment (Arabic: Moukafaha). Four commandos were wounded and several others taken prisoner, including the commander of the escort, Lieutenant Kozhayya Chamoun, who subsequently disappeared without a trace while on KRF custody (presumably assassinated). The ambush was carried out in retaliation for the death of the pro-Phalangist Captain Samir el-Achkar, leader of the dissident Lebanese Army Revolutionary Command (LARC) and a close friend of Bashir Gemayel, during a raid by the Moukafaha commandos on his headquarters at Mtaileb in the Matn District earlier that same day. Later on 31 October 1980, the KRF even attacked Lebanese Army' positions at the Ain el-Rammaneh district in East Beirut and forced a hasty withdrawal of all Army units from the area.

The KRF in the 1975–76 Civil War
During the 1975–76 phase of the Lebanese Civil War, the Kataeb Regulatory Forces' own mobilization and street action skills allowed the Phalangists to become the primary and most fearsome fighting force in the Christian-conservative camp. In Beirut and elsewhere, Phalange' militia sections were heavily committed in several battles against Lebanese National Movement (LNM) leftist militias and suffered considerable casualties, notably at the Battle of the Hotels in October 1975 where they fought the Al-Mourabitoun and the Nasserite Correctionist Movement (NCM), and later at the "Spring Offensive" held against Mount Lebanon in March 1976.

In January 1976, the Phalange joined the main Christian parties – National Liberal Party (NLP), Lebanese Renewal Party (LRP), Marada Brigade, Al-Tanzim, Maronite League and others – in a loose coalition, the Lebanese Front, designed to act as a political counterweight to the predominantly Muslim LNM alliance.  In order to deal with the Syrian military intervention of June 1976 and better coordinate the military operations of their respective militias, Christian militia leaders agreed to form on 31 August that year a joint military command (a.k.a. the "Command Council") whose new collective name was the 'Lebanese Forces'.

Reversals and re-organization 1977–79

From the very beginning, it became clear that the Lebanese Front's Command Council was dominated by the Phalange and its KRF militia under the charismatic leadership of Bashir Gemayel, who sought to unify the various Christian militias by using the LF to build a new power base for himself, distinct from that of the Phalange or any of the other traditional rightist parties. From 1977 Bashir implemented the controversial "unification of the rifle" policy, on which his KRF units destroyed those smaller militias who had refused to be absorbed voluntarily into the new structure, though not without factional quarreling and setbacks.

The Phalangists' failure to absorb or destroy the rival Marada Brigade of the Frangieh Clan in the months immediately after the Ehden killings of June 1978 resulted in a severe blow to Bashir's plans.  Not only had the Marada (and the Frangiehs) survived intact despite the loss of their Commander, but also succeeded in defeating and ruthlessly driving the KRF out of the Koura District of northern Lebanon. By the end of 1979, the Marada had kidnapped or slaughtered nearly 100 Kataeb Party' members and forced another 25,000 to flee the region or go underground. That same year, the Phalangists' also failed to force the Lebanese Armenian political parties and their respective militias into joining the Lebanese Forces. The main political parties representing the Armenian community in Lebanon – the Armenian Revolutionary Federation (ARF or Tashnag Party), the Armenian Democratic Liberal Party (ADLP or Ramgavar Party) and the Armenian Social Democratic Party (ASDP or Hunchak Party) – remained fiercely neutral and successfully rebuffed any attempts to be incorporated into the LF, even though the KRF kept them under strong pressure by shelling the Armenian-populated quarters of Bourj Hammoud, Camp Marash and Nabaa in East Beirut.

In between, the KRF lent discreet backing to the Army of Free Lebanon (AFL) and the NLP Tigers militias besieged by the Syrian Army respectively on the AFL Fayadieh barracks and the Tigers' Sodeco Square HQ at Achrafieh, during the Hundred Days' War in early February 1978.  They later played a key role on August by helping their allies in evicting the remaining Syrian units out from East Beirut.

Consolidation and dissolution 1980–81

Notwithstanding the heavy blow inflicted by the Koura disaster on the Phalangists' political and military prestige, their unification policy continued unabated. In July 1980 Bashir Gemayel proceeded to dismantle the military infrastructure of the NLP Tigers led by his rival Dany Chamoun, with the KRF destroying the backbone of the National Liberals' militia and incorporating the rest after fierce fighting in the East Beirut area that lasted until November that year. By early November 1980, the integration process had been completed and the Kataeb Regulatory Forces ceased to exist as a separate entity, now replaced by the new Lebanese Forces (LF) militia as the dominant Christian force.

Force 75
The Force 75 (Arabic: القوة خمسة وسبعون | Al-Quwwāt Khmst wa Sabeun), also designated the 75th Battalion (Arabic: الكتيبة الخامسة والسبعين | Al-Katibat al-Khamisat wa al-Sabein) or 75th Brigade (Arabic: اللواء الخامس والسبعين | Al-Liwa' al-Khamis wa al-Sabein), was the personal militia of Amine Gemayel, Bashir Gemayel's elder brother.  Technically a territorial unit of the Kataeb Regulatory Forces, the Force 75 usually operated in the north of the Matn District, where it was primarily based, though they also fought at East Beirut, participating in the final phase of the Tel al-Zaatar battle on July–August 1976.

Commanded by Sami Khoueiry, former head of the "Bashir Gemayel Brigade", and headquartered at the upper Matn town of Jdeideh, the militia was directly dependent of the Phalange regional committee headed by Amine Gemayel and enjoyed a considerable autonomy from the KRF War Council in Beirut.

Raised in 1975–76 with material help from the Lebanese Army and trained by the then Colonel Ibrahim Tannous, the Force 75 was financed by a small network of private business companies that included the ASU, colloquially known as the "Amin Special Unit" (Arabic: وحدة أمين الخاصة | Wahdat 'Amin al-Khasa), which excelled in extracting revenues from local traders in the form of paid services and protection rackets.

By December 1980, the Force 75 aligned 3,000 uniformed fighters organized into several light infantry companies backed by technicals equipped with Heavy machine-guns, recoilless rifles and AA autocannons.  That same month however, the militia was forcibly disarmed by the newly constituted Lebanese Forces (LF) on Bashir's orders and in January 1981 its members were absorbed into the LF structure.

See also 
 Army of Free Lebanon
 Al-Tanzim
 Battle of the Hotels
 Bachir Gemayel
 East Beirut canton
 Kataeb Party
 Karantina massacre
 January 1986 Lebanese Forces coup
 Lebanese Front
 Lebanese Forces
 Lebanese Forces – Executive Command
 Lebanese Civil War
 List of weapons of the Lebanese Civil War
 Maronite League
 Michel Murr
 Najjadeh Party
 Safra massacre
 Siege of Tel al-Zaatar
 Syrian Social Nationalist Party in Lebanon
 Tyous Team of Commandos
 People's Liberation Army (Lebanon)
 Phoenicianism
 William Hawi
 Young Men (Lebanon)
 Zahliote Group

Notes

References 

 Afaf Sabeh McGowan, John Roberts, As'ad Abu Khalil, and Robert Scott Mason, Lebanon: a country study, area handbook series, Headquarters, Department of the Army (DA Pam 550-24), Washington D.C. 1989. – 
 Antoine J. Abraham, The Lebanon war, Greenwood Publishing Group, 1996. 
 Alain Menargues, Les Secrets de la guerre du Liban: Du coup d'état de Béchir Gémayel aux massacres des camps palestiniens, Albin Michel, Paris 2004.  (in French)
 Barry Rubin (editor), Lebanon: Liberation, Conflict, and Crisis, Middle East in Focus, Palgrave Macmillan, London 2009.  – Lebanon: Liberation, Conflict, and Crisis
 Bassil A. Mardelli, Middle East Perspectives: From Lebanon (1968–1988), iUniverse, 2012.  – Middle East Perspectives: From Lebanon (1968–1988)
 Beate Hamizrachi, The Emergence of South Lebanon Security Belt, Praeger Publishers Inc., New York 1984. 
 Chris McNab, Soviet Submachine Guns of World War II: PPD-40, PPSh-41 and PPS, Weapon series 33, Osprey Publishing Ltd, Oxford 2014. 
 Claire Hoy and Victor Ostrovsky, By Way of Deception: The Making and Unmaking of a Mossad Officer, St. Martin's Press, New York 1990. 
 Denise Ammoun, Histoire du Liban contemporain: Tome 2 1943–1990, Éditions Fayard, Paris 2005.  (in French) – Histoire du Liban contemporain, tome 2: 1943–1990
 Edgar O'Ballance, Civil War in Lebanon, 1975–92, Palgrave Macmillan, London 1998. 
 Emilien Pepin, Beirut Model Show 2012, Steelmasters magazine 113, August–September 2012, Histoire & Collections, Paris.  (in French)
 Gordon L. Rottman, US Grenade Launchers – M79, M203, and M320, Weapon series 57, Osprey Publishing Ltd, Oxford 2017. 
 Farid El-Kazen, The Breakdown of the State in Lebanon 1967–1976, I.B. Tauris, London 2000. 
 Fawwaz Traboulsi, Identités et solidarités croisées dans les conflits du Liban contemporain; Chapitre 12: L'économie politique des milices: le phénomène mafieux, Thèse de Doctorat d'Histoire – 1993, Université de Paris VIII, 2007. (in French) – 111101 – Writings by Fawwaz Traboulsi
 Hazem Saghieh, Ta'rib al-Kata'eb al-Lubnaniyya: al-Hizb, al-sulta, al-khawf, Beirut: Dar al-Jadid, 1991. (in Arabic).
 Itamar Rabinovich, The war for Lebanon, 1970–1985, Cornell University Press, Ithaca and London 1989 (revised edition).  – The War for Lebanon, 1970–1983
 Leigh Neville, Technicals: Non-Standard Tactical Vehicles from the Great Toyota War to modern Special Forces, New Vanguard series 257, Osprey Publishing Ltd, Oxford 2018. 
 Leroy Thompson, The G3 Battle Rifle, Weapon series 68, Osprey P ublishing Ltd, Oxford 2019. 
 Jennifer Philippa Eggert, Female Fighters and Militants During the Lebanese Civil War: Individual Profiles, Pathways, and Motivations, Studies in Conflict & Terrorism, Taylor & Francis Group, LLC, 2018. – Female Fighters and Militants During the Lebanese Civil War: Individual Profiles, Pathways, and Motivations
 Joseph A. Kechichian, The Lebanese Army: Capabilities and Challenges in the 1980s, Conflict Quarterly, Winter 1985.
 Joseph Hokayem, L'armée libanaise pendant la guerre: un instrument du pouvoir du président de la République (1975–1985), Lulu.com, Beyrouth 2012.  (in French) – L'armée libanaise pendant la guerre: un instrument du pouvoir du président de la République (1975–1985)
 Jonathan Randall, The Tragedy of Lebanon: Christian Warlords, Israeli Adventurers, and American Bunglers, Just World Books, Charlottesville, Virginia 2012. 
 Joseph Saadé: Victime et Bourreau. Une vie racontée par Frédéric Brunnquell et Frédéric Couderc, Calman-Lévy, Paris 1994.  (in French)
 Matthew S. Gordon, The Gemayels (World Leaders Past & Present), Chelsea House Publishers, 1988. 
 Moustafa El-Assad, Blue Steel IV: M-50 Shermans and M-50 APCs in South Lebanon, Blue Steel books, Sidon 2007. 
 Moustafa El-Assad, Civil Wars Volume 1: The Gun Trucks, Blue Steel books, Sidon 2008. 
 Nader Moumneh, The Lebanese Forces: Emergence and Transformation of the Christian Resistance, Hamilton Books, London 2019. 
 Oren Barak, The Lebanese Army – A National institution in a divided society, State University of New York Press, Albany 2009.  – The Lebanese Army: A National Institution in a Divided Society
 Paul Jureidini, R. D. McLaurin, and James Price, Military operations in selected Lebanese built-up areas, 1975–1978, Aberdeen, MD: U.S. Army Human Engineering Laboratory, Aberdeen Proving Ground, Technical Memorandum 11-79, June 1979.
 Rex Brynen, Sanctuary and Survival: the PLO in Lebanon, Boulder: Westview Press, Oxford 1990.  – Sanctuary and Survival: The PLO in Lebanon
 Robert Fisk, Pity the Nation: Lebanon at War, London: Oxford University Press, (3rd ed. 2001).  – Pity the Nation: Lebanon at War
 Samir Kassir, La Guerre du Liban: De la dissension nationale au conflit régional, Éditions Karthala/CERMOC, Paris 1994.  (in French)
 Samer Kassis, 30 Years of Military Vehicles in Lebanon, Beirut: Elite Group, 2003. 
 Samer Kassis, Véhicules Militaires au Liban/Military Vehicles in Lebanon 1975–1981, Trebia Publishing, Chyah 2012. 
 Samer Kassis, Invasion of Lebanon 1982, Abteilung 502, 2019.  – Invasion of Lebanon
 Samuel M. Katz, Lee E. Russel, and Ron Volstad, Armies in Lebanon 1982–84, Men-at-Arms series 165, Osprey Publishing Ltd, London 1985. 
 Steven J. Zaloga, Armour of the Middle East Wars 1948–78, Vanguard series 19, Osprey Publishing Ltd, London 1981. 
 Thomas Collelo (ed.), Lebanon: a country study, Library of Congress, Federal Research Division, Headquarters, Department of the Army (DA Pam 550-24), Washington D.C., December 1987 (Third edition 1989). – 
 Yezid Sayigh, Armed Struggle and the Search for State: the Palestinian National Movement, 1949–1993, Clarendon Press, Oxford 1998. 
 Zachary Sex & Bassel Abi-Chahine, Modern Conflicts 2 – The Lebanese Civil War, From 1975 to 1991 and Beyond, Modern Conflicts Profile Guide Volume II, AK Interactive, 2021. ISBN 8435568306073

Further reading

 Fawwaz Traboulsi, A History of Modern Lebanon: Second Edition, Pluto Press, London 2012. 
 Frank Stoakes, The Super vigilantes: the Lebanese Kata'eb Party as Builder, Surrogate, and Defender of the State, Middle East Studies 11, 3 (October 1975): 215236.
 Jago Salmon, Massacre and Mutilation: Understanding the Lebanese Forces through their use of violence, Workshop on the 'techniques of Violence in Civil War', PRIO, Oslo, August 20–21, 2004. – [PDF Understanding the Lebanese Forces through their use of – Free Download PDF]
 Jean Sarkis, Histoire de la guerre du Liban, Presses Universitaires de France – PUF, Paris 1993.  (in French)
 John P. Entelis, Pluralism and party transformation in Lebanon: Al-Kata'ib, 1936–1970, E. J. Brill, Leiden 1974.
 Leila Haoui Zod, William Haoui, temoin et martyr, Mémoire DEA, Faculté d'Histoire, Université Saint Esprit, Kaslik, Liban 2004. (in French)
 Marius Deeb, The Lebanese Civil War, Praeger Publishers Inc., New York 1980. 
 Marie-Christine Aulas, The Socio-Ideological Development of the Maronite Community: The Emergenge of the Phalanges and Lebanese Forces, Arab Studies Quarterly 7, 4 (Fall 1985): pp. 1–27.
Richard Labévière, La Tuerie d'Ehden ou la malédiction des Arabes chrétiens, Éditions Fayard, Paris 2009. , 2213643652 (in French)
 William W. Harris, Faces of Lebanon: Sects, Wars, and Global Extensions, Princeton Series on the Middle East, Markus Wiener Publishers, Princeton 1997. ,

External links
 Official Lebanese Phalange Party site
 The Lebanese Phalanges – Kataeb
 Bachir Gemayel Squad Website
 Steelmasters Magazine site
 official Blue-Steel books site
 blue-steel-books internet blog
 site of the Elitegroup-Lebanon
 HK – Elie HOBEIKA: The Lebanese war and its very complex and many dimensions... Secrets of the Lebanese civil war – a little biased, but containing useful info on Kataeb militia operations.
 The Lebanese Civil War account of the Lebanese civil war, same as above.
 Histoire militaire de l'armée libanaise de 1975 à 1990 (in French)
 CIA report on the Lebanese Phalangist Party, 15 May 1981

Factions in the Lebanese Civil War
Lebanese factions allied with Israel
Military wings of nationalist parties
Military wings of fascist parties
Lebanese Front
Lebanese nationalism
Phoenicianism
Paramilitary organisations based in Lebanon